Centrists for Europe (CpE) is a Christian-democratic political party in Italy. The party was launched, as Centrists for Italy (Centristi per l'Italia, CpI), by splinters from the Union of the Centre in December 2016 and officially founded, with the current name, in February 2017. Its most recognisable leader is Pier Ferdinando Casini.

History
In the run-up of the 2016 Italian constitutional referendum the Union of the Centre (UdC) chose to campaign for "No", while the New Centre-Right, the UdC's counterpart in Popular Area (AP), was among the keenest supporters of "Yes".

After the referendum, which saw a huge defeat of the "Yes" side, the UdC left AP altogether. However, some UdC splinters, notably including Pier Ferdinando Casini, Gianpiero D'Alia (who had previously launched Centrists for Sicily) and minister Gian Luca Galletti, launched "Centrists for Italy" and confirmed their alliance with the NCD within Popular Area.

The party was officially founded, with the current name, in February 2017. At the time the CpE included one minister (Galletti, who had been confirmed in the Gentiloni Cabinet in December), two deputies (D'Alia and Ferdinando Adornato) and three senators (Casini, Aldo Di Biagio and Luigi Marino). Also former minister Francesco D'Onofrio joined the party.

In December 2017, the CpE launched the Popular Civic List (CP), within the centre-left coalition, along with Popular Alternative (AP), Italy of Values (IdV), Solidary Democracy (DemoS), the Union for Trentino (UpT), Italy is Popular (IP) and minor parties/groups. The new leader of AP, Beatrice Lorenzin, was chosen as leader of the list too.

In the 2018 Italian general election, CP obtained a mere 0.5%, but Casini was re-elected to the Senate from a single-seat constituency in Bologna, thanks to the decisive support of the Democratic Party.

In the 2022 Italian general election, CpE run within the list Democratic Party – Democratic and Progressive Italy (PD–IDP) and Casini was re-elected to the Senate for the single-member constituency of Bologna.

Electoral results

Italian Parliament

Regional Councils

External links
Official website

References

2016 establishments in Italy
Centrist parties in Italy
Catholic political parties
Christian democratic parties in Italy
Political parties established in 2016